Sephora is a French multinational retailer of personal care and beauty products with nearly 340 brands, along with its own private label, Sephora Collection, and includes beauty products such as  cosmetics, skincare, body, fragrance, nail color, beauty tools, body lotions and haircare.

The company was founded in Limoges in 1969 and is currently based in Neuilly-sur-Seine, France. Sephora is owned by luxury conglomerate LVMH as of 1997. The name comes from the Greek word meaning beauty, sephos, and the Greek spelling of Zipporah (Sepphōra), wife of Moses, described in midrash, aggadah and Targum Onkelos as beautiful.

History

Sephora was first launched in Paris in August 1970. It was acquired by Dominique Mandonnaud in 1993, who merged the purchase with his own perfume chain under the Sephora brand. Mandonnaud is credited for designing and executing Sephora's "assisted self-service" sales experience, which separated itself from standard retail models for cosmetics by encouraging customers to test products in retail locations before purchasing.

Mandonnaud continued to expand the Sephora brand through the 1990s, opening up its flagship store in Champs Élysées in 1997. In July 1997, Mandonnaud and his partners sold Sephora to LVMH, who expanded the stores globally and bolstered the chain's products to include beauty and cosmetic products. Sephora extended its operation to the Middle Eastern markets in 2007 and has opened over 44 Sephora UAE and KSA stores as well as an eCommerce store. It extends its partnership with its exclusive brands in the region.

On 1 January 2014, Calvin McDonald replaced David Suliteanu as president and chief executive officer of Sephora Americas. Suliteanu was named CEO of Kendo Brands, another business in the LVMH portfolio.

Sephora opened its first United States store in New York City in 1998, its first Canadian store in Toronto in 2004 and the first Australian Sephora store in 2014. Its North American headquarters is located in New York City, with corporate offices in San Francisco and Montréal. Sephora currently operates over 430 stores across North America.

On 26 August 2016, Sephora opened its 400th location in North America on the Magnificent Mile in Chicago. The store is the city's new flagship location.

On 31 March 2017, Sephora opened its largest retail location in North America near Herald Square in New York City. The store is approximately 11,380 square feet and features over 13,000 products. It's one of six Sephora TIP Workshop locations, with interactive services and tools, in North America; the others include San Francisco, Boston, Chicago, Santa Clara Valley, and Toronto.

On 19 November 2018, Sephora signed a long-term lease at Thor Equities’ Town Square Metepec, a new retail and entertainment center in Mexico totaling 1.7 million square feet.

On July 26, 2021, Sephora agreed with Palamon Capital Partners the purchase of Feelunique.com, a UK online retailer of prestige beauty goods founded in 2005, with 1.3 million active customers from 120 countries and more than 35,000 products from over 800 brands. It had been acquired from Palamon Capital Partners for £26 million in 2012. The price was rumored to be £132 million.

Operations
Sephora launched its online store in the U.S. in 1999 and in Canada in 2003. The Canadian head office was opened in February 2007 by Marie-Christine Marchives, a former Sephora U.S. and Sephora France employee. Marie-Christine Marchives returned to France in July 2010 to become the general manager of Sephora France. She was replaced in Canada by Klaus Ryum-Larsen. Sephora currently operates over 2,300 stores in 33 countries worldwide, generating over an estimated $4 billion in revenue as of 2013. As of September 2013, the Sephora at Champs Élysées in Paris, France, attracts over six million people a year. Afterpay and Sephora partnered to offer its customers the flexibility to pay in four installments on July 13, 2022.

Brands
Sephora features a variety of beauty products from more than 300 brands, including Tatcha, Huda Beauty, Kat Von D, and Bobbi Brown Cosmetics. Sephora also features its own make-up, skincare, beauty tools and accessories under the brand name Sephora Collection. Packaging for the line previously featured the company's elongated flame logo in standard black print. The new logo features the updated "Sephora Quality, Really Good Price" logo with the $ sign.

In 2013, the company included fragrance collections from Mary-Kate and Ashley Olsen, known as Elizabeth and James, and a makeup line with Marc Jacobs.

On the 25th of June 2020, Maddie Ziegler's imagination collection collaborated with Morphe launched in Sephora Canada.

Sephora inside JCPenney 
In October 2006, Sephora began opening stores inside JCPenney. Sephora inside JCPenney features some of the same makeup, skincare, and fragrance brands as well as its own product line found in stand alone stores nationwide. Sephora inside JCPenney stores are much smaller than a normal store, usually 1,500 sq ft in size.  As of 2017, there were more than 600 Sephora locations in JCPenney stores across the US.  That same year, JC Penney announced the closing of 138 stores nationwide, several of which house a Sephora in JCPenney store.

Sephora inside Kohl's
In December 2020, Sephora announced that it would begin opening Sephora stores inside Kohl's locations. The announcement included plans to launch Sephora at 850 Kohl's stores by 2023. The first four Sephora inside Kohl's locations opened on August 6, 2021.

Subscription service
In August 2015, it was announced that Sephora would launch a subscription service: Play! By Sephora.  The monthly subscription service offers boxes containing sample size products for a monthly fee. Boston, Columbus, and Cincinnati were the only three cities to test the initial service launch in September 2015. The service was launched throughout the US in 2016.

For $10 USD billed monthly, each month’s box is a collectable bag that changes each month with five deluxe skincare, makeup, or haircare samples. Each box includes a selection of products based on answers provided by the customer in PLAY! profile.

Sephora terminated PLAY! in April 2020, replacing it with Sephora Luxe. Like Play!, Luxe gives the opportunity to sample products, but Luxe is ordered monthly and is not a subscription service.

Sephora UAE and KSA 
Sephora UAE and KSA are regional subdivisions of Sephora. The Middle East head office was opened in February 2006 by Pierre Fayard. Since 2007, over 30 separate Sephora stores have opened across the Middle East region (UAE, KSA, Bahrain, Qatar, Kuwait). Sephora UAE and KSA provide make up and skincare products from notable brands such as Christian Dior, Laura Mercier and Kat Von D in a high tech contemporary retail environment. Sephora’s first Middle East store opened at Seef Mall in Bahrain on 7 January 2007 followed by Festival City, UAE on 1 March 2007 with a further 30 stores opening across the region since. The Sephora store in the Dubai Mall opened in December 2008 and is now ranked as the company’s number one store worldwide. In 2007, the late Sephora CEO, Jacques Levy expressed a desire to have 100 stores open across the region by 2010. A year later the international financial crisis derailed these ambitions. Levy stepped down in 2011 and died a year later. Despite this early setback Sephora have opened more than 30 more stores and introduced online shopping to the region in November 2016. In December 2017, Sephora opened ‘Gifts Beauty Park, the world's first beauty Festive playground in Dubai. The pop-up store featured fairground and makeup themed games and invited shoppers to sit down with professional Sephora makeup artists to experience the products. In March 2018, Guillaume Motte was announced as the new president of Sephora Europe and Middle East.

Sephora North America 
Sephora USA was launched in 1999 and Sephora Canada in 2003.

Sephora Singapore 
Sephora Singapore was launched in December 2008.

Products 
Sephora’s Middle East stores stock internationally renowned products by the like of Estée Lauder and subsidiary Clinique, alongside local brands such as Shiffa Dubai Skin Care and Huda Beauty. According to Forbes, Huda Beauty, founded by Dubai based blogger and business woman Huda Kattan, was the top selling cosmetic brand across Sephora Middle East, in 2018.

Applications
In 2016, Sephora launched its own all access tablet and smartphone application Designed "made manifest" by Dennis Hornstra,  a software and application designer for Apple. It can be seen as an augmented reality platform. Pocket Contour, one of the digital programs that was rolled out, teaches users how to contour their skin step-by-step depending on their face shape. By uploading a photo, the user can receive a virtual makeover, experimenting with different product and shade combinations.

Acquisitions
In 2000, Sephora.com purchased the assets of Eve.com for "high six-figures".

Controversies
In April 2019, R&B singer SZA accused the store of racial profiling. On May 23, 2019, Sephora announced they would be closing all locations on Wednesday, June 5, 2019, to hold diversity training for its staff. However, the staff training was a part of their "We Belong To Something Beautiful Campaign" and not the accusations from the singer. The planning and training for this campaign began in late 2019.

In February 2020, an ex-employee of Sephora launched a website accusing the store of bullying culture, mishandling of staff complaints, and wage theft.

Lawsuits
On 18 November 2014, four customers filed a class action lawsuit against Sephora. The suit alleges that Sephora engaged in racial discrimination by wrongfully deactivating the customer rewards accounts of Asian customers under the pretense that these customers were buying products from Sephora in bulk and reselling them. Sephora identified accounts to deactivate by looking at email domains from @qq.com (owned by Tencent), @126.com, or @163.com (both owned by NetEase).

Environmental record
Sephora’s sustainable development initiatives were recognized in December 2015. The company received the Sustainable Brand label, as well as the 2015 R Award for eco-design by the Génération Responsible association. Global Cosmetic News reported that Sephora's newly launched display cases have a 30% lighter metal frame that will reduce CO2 emissions by 220 metric tons.

In 2020, Sephora announced it would no longer carry eyelashes made of mink fur, which has been shown to come from farms where animals are mistreated. The company said it was compelled by concerned customers and a PETA campaign to sell only synthetic lashes.

Social responsibility
In June of 2020, Sephora announced that it would take the 15 Percent Pledge, pledging to fill 15 percent of their shelf space with Black-owned businesses.

Awards and honors
In 2010, Women's Wear Daily named Sephora the specialty retailer of the year.

In March 2018, FastCompany named Sephora to the number 36 spot (of 50) on their list of "World’s Most Innovative Companies", citing its expanded offering of broadly diverse and inclusive product lines like Fenty Beauty.

See also 
Watsons

References

External links 

 

Companies based in San Francisco
Cosmetics companies of France
Manufacturing companies established in 1970
Retail companies established in 1997
French brands
LVMH brands
Retail companies of France
Beauty stores